Geoffrey Irwin (born 1941) is a professor of archaeology at the University of Auckland. He was a professor of anthropology at the University of Auckland until he retired in 2008. He is the author of The Prehistoric Exploration and Colonization of the Pacific (1994).

References

Academic staff of the University of Auckland
1941 births
Living people